John Riel Reponte Casimero (born February 13, 1989) is a Filipino professional boxer and YouTuber. He has held world championships in three weight classes; including the IBF junior-flyweight title from 2012 to 2013; the IBF flyweight title in 2016; and the WBO bantamweight title from 2019 to 2022. Quadro Alas is Tagalog for four of a kind when translated, his moniker means Four Aces.

Professional career

Early career at flyweight and light-flyweight 
On August 23, 2008, just a year after turning pro, Casimero defeated Rodel Quilaton for the then vacant Philippines Boxing Federeration (PBF) flyweight title, winning a unanimous decision (UD) through ten rounds. Following the bout, Casimero moved down one division, to light flyweight, defeating Liempetch Sor Veerapol of Thailand by technical knockout (TKO) in the fifth round to claim the then vacant WBO Asia Pacific Light Flyweight title. Casimero successfully defended that title two bouts later against Ardin Diale, until he got the biggest break of his career.

Light-flyweight

Casimero vs. Canchila 
On December 19, 2009, in Managua, Nicaragua, Casimero won the then-vacant interim WBO light flyweight title, by defeating former interim WBA Light Flyweight champion César Canchila of Colombia. Canchila had a record of 28–2 coming into the bout, with his last loss coming from current WBA light flyweight world champion Giovanni Segura, whom he previously defeated for the interim title. Casimero gave a spectacular performance, the fight being his first outside his home country. He was able to knockdown Canchila multiple times until the referee finally stopped the bout in the 11th round of the scheduled 12 round interim title fight. This win can give Casimero a title shot against Iván Calderón of Puerto Rico, who previously defeated Filipino boxer Rodel Mayol.

Casimero vs. Hirales 
Casimero fought Ramón García Hirales on July 3, 2010, for his first defense of the interim WBO light flyweight title but lost by split decision.

Flyweight

Casimero vs. Mthalane 
Casimero got his first shot at a world title when he challenged Moruti Mthalane of South Africa for the IBF flyweight title on March 26, 2011. He was, however, stopped by the South African in five rounds, therefore marking his second career loss.

Return to light-flyweight

Casimero vs. Lazarte 
On February 11, 2012, Casimero, and members of his team were kicked and assaulted when fans in Mar del Plata hurled chairs and stormed the ring following his 10th-round knockout of local Argentine fighter Luis Alberto Lazarte for the IBF interim junior flyweight championship. After the riot, police escorted Casimero and his team to their hotel and provided protection for them. Lazarte later visited to apologize. The Philippines has filed a diplomatic protest to the Argentine government after Argentine fans attacked Casimero in the ring after winning the title bout. Philippine Foreign Affairs spokesman Raul Hernandez stated that the Philippine Embassy in Buenos Aires filed a protest with Argentina's Ministry of Foreign Affairs and is awaiting an explanation. Lazarte was banned by IBF for threat, sparking a ring riot.

On July 19, 2012, Casimero was upgraded to the status of full IBF junior flyweight champion because of the inability of Ulises Solis to defend his title on or before October 30.

Casimero vs. Guevara 
On his first defense of the IBF junior flyweight title, Casimero faced Pedro Guevara of Mexico on August 4, 2012. He scored a knockdown in the opening round and fought to a split decision victory.

He successfully made a second defense of his title against WBC Latino light flyweight champion Luis Alberto Rios on March 16, 2013. His third defense was against Felipe Salguero on October 26, 2013 and he won by eleventh-round knockout.

Return to flyweight

Casimero vs. Ruenroeng I 
Following his win against Mauricio Fuentes and Armando Santos, Casimero moved back up to the flyweight division. On June 27, 2015, he lost his return to flyweight bout via unanimous decision against IBF champion Amnat Ruenroeng in a controversial match.

Casimero vs. Ruenroeng II 
On May 25, 2016, Casimero challenged Ruenroeng again for the IBF flyweight title and knocked him out with a vicious left hook to the body in the fourth round to become a two-division world champion.

Casimero vs. Edwards 
In his second title defence, Casimero faced undefeated Charlie Edwards, on September 10, 2016 on the undercard of Gennady Golovkin vs. Kell Brook at The O2 Arena in London, England. Casimero was on the offensive for most of the fight, as Edwards was unable to deal with Casimero's ring craft. Casimero upped the pace in the tenth round, and dropped Edwards with a left hook. Edwards beat the count, but as soon as he got up, Casimero unleashed a flurry of punches towards the challenger, which prompted the referee to end the fight immediately.

Bantamweight
Following Casimero's successful title defense against Charlie Edwards in September 2016, he moved up in weight, fighting in non-title bouts at super-flyweight, bantamweight and even one bout against Jose Pech at featherweight before settling at the bantamweight division, where he defeated Ricardo Espinoza Franco via twelfth-round knockout to win the WBO interim bantamweight title in his first fight in the United States on April 20, 2019. He defended the interim title on August 24, 2019 against Cesar Ramirez, winning via tenth-round knockout, to become full WBO bantamweight titleholder Zolani Tete's mandatory challenger, setting up a showdown with Tete.

Casimero vs. Tete 
On 30 November 2019, Casimero challenged Zolani Tete for his WBO bantamweight title in Birmingham, England. Despite Tete being the favorite for the fight, Casimero scored a third-round knockout over the long-reigning champion to capture his WBO bantamweight title. The victory meant that Casimero became a three-division world champion.

Cancelled bout vs. Naoya Inoue 
Casimero had been scheduled to face undefeated unified bantamweight champion Naoya Inoue in a unification clash on April 25, 2020, but the COVID-19 pandemic caused the fight to be cancelled.

He instead faced Duke Micah, ranked #11 by the WBO, in his first WBO bantamweight title defense on September 26, 2020 on the undercard of The Charlos vs. Dereyvanchenko and Rosario. Casimero recorded another stoppage win, again in the third round, to retain his WBO belt.

Casimero vs. Rigondeaux 
Casimero faced two-time Olympic gold medalist Guillermo Rigondeaux on August 14, 2021. In a low-key affair that saw the CompuBox record broken for fewest combined landed punches in a 12-round fight, Casimero pressured his opponent all night, fighting on the front foot and throwing more punches than Rigondeaux, who was reluctant to engage. Casimero was rewarded with a split decision victory, with scores of 117–111 and 116–112 in his favor, and 115–113 in favor of Rigondeaux.

In his post-fight interview, Casimero criticized his opponent's extremely passive gameplan, saying "I'm focused on [the] knockout, but Rigondeaux always runs. Rigondeaux just always runs. No fighting." He continued by reaffirming that it is his intention to unify the bantamweight division, targeting the division's other titleholders, Nonito Donaire and Naoya Inoue. Casimero concluded his interview by issuing the middle finger to Inoue.

Cancelled bout vs. Nonito Donaire 
It was announced on June 19, 2021 that WBC champion Nonito Donaire would replace Rigondeaux, but when the fight between Casimero and Donaire fell apart over insults directed at Donaire's wife, Rigondeaux stepped back in to fight Casimero as had been originally planned.

Cancelled bout vs. Paul Butler 
Casimero had been scheduled to fight his mandatory challenger and former IBF bantamweight champion Paul Butler on December 11, 2021 at Coca-Cola Arena in Dubai, United Arab Emirates. Casimero withdrew before the weigh-ins after being rushed to the hospital due to viral gastritis. The bout had been rescheduled on April 22, 2022 at M&S Bank Arena in Liverpool, England but Casimero was not permitted to fight by the British Boxing Board of Control (BBBofC) due to medical guidelines violation by using a sauna to cut weight "in close proximity" to the fight. Casimero's late replacement, fellow Filipino Jonas Sultan, lost to Butler by unanimous decision, making Butler the interim champion. On May 4, the WBO stripped Casimero of the title, with Butler supplanting him.

Professional boxing record

Exhibition boxing record

Titles in boxing 
Major world titles:
IBF light flyweight champion (108 lbs)
IBF flyweight champion (112 lbs)
WBO bantamweight champion (118 lbs)

Interim titles:
WBO interim light flyweight champion (108 lbs)
IBF interim light flyweight champion (108 lbs)
WBO interim bantamweight champion (118 lbs)

Regional titles:
 flyweight champion (112 lbs)
WBO Asia Pacific light flyweight champion (108 lbs)

Controversy

Acts of lasciviousness 
Casimero is facing a case of “Acts of lasciviousness and RA 7610”; the case involves the alleged molestation of a 17-year-old, whom the boxer had invited to his hotel room in Taguig last June 7, 2021. The complaint was filed on February 11, 2022, according to Southern Police District.

Casimero's brother and trainer, Jayson, said the complaint was “fabricated” and that their camp knows who is behind the case. He also stated that their lawyer will issue a statement regarding the matter.

Personal life 
Casimero has two daughters from a previous relationship.

Entertainment career

Internet 
Casimero has a YouTube channel called Quadro alas tv vlog. Casimero also had a channel called Quadro Alas it's my boy but is now mainly managed by his brother and trainer, Jayson, since late 2021.

Battle of the YouTubers 
On August 20, 2021, Vloggers TV announced that Casimero will be fighting in the first Battle of the YouTubers Season 2 celebrity boxing card. It was announced on December 22, 2021 that Casimero will be facing Jormiel Labador in the supporting bout scheduled on December 28, 2021 in Metro Manila, Philippines. However, Casimero was forced to pull out of the exhibition matched after the WBO prohibited Casimero from partaking in any event negotiations without the authorization of the sanctioning body and Probellum—the promoter of the card that was supposed to be topped by the postponed title defense against Paul Butler on December 11, 2021. Casimero was replaced by his brother and trainer, Jayson, in the exhibition bout and won.

See also
List of world light-flyweight boxing champions
List of world flyweight boxing champions
List of world bantamweight boxing champions
List of Filipino boxing world champions
List of boxing triple champions

References

External links

John Riel Casimero - Profile, News Archive & Current Rankings at Box.Live

1989 births
Living people
Filipino male boxers
People from Ormoc
Boxers from Leyte (province)
People from Mandaue
Filipino YouTubers
World light-flyweight boxing champions
World flyweight boxing champions
World bantamweight boxing champions
International Boxing Federation champions
World Boxing Organization champions